is a railway station of the Chūō Main Line, East Japan Railway Company (JR East) in the city of Ōtsuki, Yamanashi Prefecture, Japan.

Lines
Saruhashi Station is served by the Chūō Main Line / Chūō Rapid Line, and is  85.3 kilometers from the terminus of the line at Tokyo Station.

Station layout
The station consists of one ground level island platform, with an elevated station building located above the platform. The station is staffed.

Platforms

Station history
Saruhashi Station was opened on October 1, 1902, as a passenger and freight station on the Japanese National Railways (JNR) Chūō Main Line. The name of the station was originally Eikyo-eki, but changed to its present pronunciation of the same kanji on August 1, 1918. Freight services were discontinued from April 20, 1960. With the dissolution and privatization of the JNR on April 1, 1987, the station came under the control of the East Japan Railway Company. The station building was rebuilt in 1997. Automated turnstiles using the Suica IC Card system came into operation from November 18, 2001.

Passenger statistics
In fiscal 2017, the station was used by an average of 1358 passengers daily (boarding passengers only).

Surrounding area
Saruhashi, a famous historical bridge and designated National Place of Scenic Beauty

See also
 List of railway stations in Japan

References

 Miyoshi Kozo. Chuo-sen Machi to eki Hyaku-niju nen. JT Publishing (2009)

External links

Official home page.

Railway stations in Yamanashi Prefecture
Railway stations in Japan opened in 1902
Chūō Main Line
Stations of East Japan Railway Company
Ōtsuki, Yamanashi